Perforce, legally Perforce Software, Inc., is an American developer of software used for developing and running applications, including version control software, web-based repository management, developer collaboration, application lifecycle management, web application servers, debugging tools and Agile planning software.

The company is based in Minneapolis, Minnesota, and is equally owned by private equity firms Clearlake Capital and Francisco Partners.

History
Perforce Software was founded in 1995 in Alameda, California by Christopher Seiwald, a software developer and computer science graduate from UC Berkeley. Its first product was also called Perforce, and was a version control system allowing companies to collaborate on large software projects by keeping track of changes to both the source code and binary files.

In June 2013, the company released Helix Swarm, a tool for developers working in different geographic areas to collaborate on code review.

In June 2014, the company released a version of its Perforce versioning engine, by then known as P4D, which supported concurrency.

In March 2015, the company renamed its product to Perforce Helix, which now supported distributed development and included security features allowing suspicious usage tracking. Helix's security capabilities included IP threat detection, co-developed with analytics vendor Interset. In October, the company collaborated with GitLab to release GitSwarm, a software tool that combined git distributed workflow for developers with Perforce's single code repository.

In February 2016, Seiwald sold the company to investment group Summit Partners, and Janet Dryer was named as new CEO. The company headquarters was relocated to Minneapolis. In November, Perforce announced the acquisition of Seapine Software, a provider of application lifecycle management (ALM) tools.  Seapine's TestTrack ALM software was rebranded as Helix ALM.

In September 2017, the company acquired Uppsala, Sweden-based Hansoft, a developer of Agile planning software.  Also in September, Perforce announced it had acquired Finnish repository management services company Deveo. Deveo's products were merged into Perforce's Helix TeamHub, its first solo venture for Git-based development teams.

In January 2018, Summit Partners sold Perforce to private equity firm Clearlake Capital. In May, Perforce acquired UK-based Programming Research (PRQA), a static code analysis firm. In June, the company announced that CEO Janet Dryer was moving to the role of Chair of the Board, and COO/CFO Mark Ties was taking the role of CEO. In October, the company acquired mobile and web automation testing company Perfecto.

In January 2019, Perforce announced the acquisition of Rogue Wave Software, a software company with a focus on development tools for high-performance computing. In April, private equity firm Francisco Partners acquired 50% of Perforce, becoming an equal partner with Clearlake Capital. In September, Perforce Software was awarded the 2019 Computer Entertainment Developers Conference (CEDEC) Award for Engineering for Helix Core.

In June 2020, Perforce acquired software developer TestCraft Technologies, a provider of automated Selenium-based web application testing. In July, Perforce acquired software developer Methodics, a DevOps software provider of intellectual property life cycle management for semiconductor companies.

In October 2021, Perforce agreed to buy BlazeMeter testing platform from Broadcom Inc for an undisclosed sum.

In April 2022, Perforce acquired the Portland, Oregon-based infrastructure automation software platform, Puppet.

Products
Perforce develops software used by software developers to manage code during the development process.  The product line includes the following:

Helix Core

Helix Core, formerly Perforce Helix, is the company's version control software for large scale development environments. The Helix Version Control System manages a central database and a master repository of file versions.

Helix Core clients fall into roughly five categories: Git, command, GUI, web, and plugin. The Perforce system can make part or all of its content available as Git repositories. Users of Git and of other clients can work with the same file content and history.  Git commits are visible to users of other clients as Perforce changelists, and vice versa.  Users submit changed files together in changelists, which are applied as atomic commits.

The server and client software are released as pre-built executables for Microsoft Windows, macOS, Linux, Solaris, FreeBSD, and other operating systems.

Helix ALM

Helix ALM, formerly TestTrack, is a suite of tools used for application lifecycle management (ALM), allowing developers to manage all their product and system development phases with one product.  The software was originally developed by Seapine Software, which was acquired by Perforce and rebranded. Helix ALM provides a centralized suite of capabilities for managing requirements, defects, issues and testing throughout the software development cycle.

There are three components of the suite:
Helix RM for requirements management
Helix IM for issue tracking and management
Helix TCM for test case management

Helix QAC

The company develops the Helix QAC static code analysis software tool for the C and C++ programming languages.

Other products and services
Helix TeamHub is a code and artifact hosting and developer collaboration tool that supports development in Git environments, in addition to Apache Subversion and Mercurial.  
Helix Swarm is a development tool integrated with Helix Core, that allows geographically dispersed developers to coordinate their code review.
Hansoft is software used to support agile software development.
Perfecto is a testing platform for desktop and mobile apps.
TestCraft is an automated Selenium-based web application testing platform.

Acquired Rogue Wave Software products and services
With the January 2019 Rogue Wave acquisition, Perforce acquired the following products: 

Akana - a provider of computer software products for application programming interface (API) management
CodeDynamics - a software tool for dynamic code analysis
Gliffy - software for diagramming via an HTML5 cloud-based app
HostAccess - a suite of terminal emulation products for Windows
HydraExpress - a framework for creating C++ Web services from existing C++ code 
IMSL Numerical Libraries - a commercial collection of software libraries of numerical analysis functionality for computer programming
PV-WAVE - an array oriented fourth-generation programming language used to build and deploy visual data analysis applications
JRebel and XRebel - Java development and performance management tools for software developers
Klocwork - a static code analysis tool
SourcePro - software that enables developers to build C++ apps using common APIs that can be migrated from one platform to another 
Stingray - a tool for developing object oriented front ends for Windows programming
TotalView for HPC - Debugging software for C/C++, Fortran, and Mixed-Language Python Applications 
Visualization - data visualization tools to assist with application development, including a GUI builder and data management abstraction capabilities
Zend Server - a web application server for running and managing PHP applications
Zend Studio - a commercial, proprietary integrated development environment (IDE) for PHP

In addition, Perforce also acquired OpenLogic, a consulting organization with expertise in open source software from Rogue Wave.

Customers
Perforce's customers are software developers at a wide variety of companies, including Salesforce, Netflix, SAP, Disney, Intuit and the NYSE. The company is considered a leader in the gaming space, with 18 of the top 20 games developers including Ubisoft and Electronic Arts using Perforce version control.

Offices
The company is headquartered in Minneapolis, Minnesota, with additional offices worldwide.

References

External links

Software companies established in 1995
American companies established in 1995
1995 establishments in California
Companies based in Minneapolis
Software companies based in Minneapolis
Software companies based in Minnesota
Cloud platforms
Git (software)
Cloud computing providers
Privately held companies based in Minnesota
2018 mergers and acquisitions
Private equity portfolio companies
Software companies of the United States